Santana Futebol Clube is a football club that plays in the São Tomé and Príncipe Championship.  The team is based in the island of São Tomé.  The team has won one title and is the seventh team ever to win their first title as well as their only title in 1991.  In the same year, they won the opening and the insular titles as well.  Santana are one of two clubs from Cantagalo to get a national competitive honor.

Santana was the first São Tomean club to participate in any of the African competitions in 1999, the next appearance was in 2001 and the third was in 2013.

Santana was relegated to the regional Second Division in 2011 and remained there for three seasons until they reached the top two.  Santana spent three seasons in the Premier Division, in 2016, the club finished 11th place which was inside the relegation zone.  Santana is currently in the Second Division for the 2017 season.

Honours
National:
São Tomé and Príncipe Championships: 1
1991
Taça Nacional de São Tomé e Principe: 1
1991

Regional:
São Tomé Island League: 1
1991
Taça Regional de São Tomé: 1
1991

League and cup history

Performance in CAF competitions
CAF Champions League: 1 appearance
1999 – withdrew in Preliminary Round, competed with Sony Elá Nguema of Equatorial Guinea

Island championships

Statistics
Best position: 1st (national)
Best position at cup competitions: 1st (national)
Appearances:
National: 1
Regional: 33

External links
Santana FC at Soccerway
Santana FC at the Final Ball

Football clubs in São Tomé and Príncipe
São Tomé Island Second Division
Cantagalo District